General elections were held in Sweden on 15 September 1940. The Swedish Social Democratic Party remained the largest party, winning 134 of the 230 seats in the Andra kammaren of the Riksdag.  It is one of two general elections in Swedish history where a single party received more than half of the vote (the other occasion being 1968).

The election took place amid World War II. Sweden was the only independent, free Scandinavian state at the time. The major parties were all represented in the government cabinet. Some of the parties called for a postponement of the elections due to the war. However, Per Albin Hansson said that democratic processes ought to be respected. An observer of the election characterized the election as a "gentleman's election" free of mudslinging.

Results

References

General elections in Sweden
Sweden
General
Sweden